John Hyslop Steele  (15 November 1926 – 4 November 2013) was a British oceanographer who made major contributions to the study of marine ecosystems.

Work
In 1951 Steele began work at the Marine Laboratory in Aberdeen, Scotland.
He was appointed director of the Woods Hole Oceanographic Institution in 1977.
After his retirement from Woods Hole in 1989, Steele continued his interests of research and served on the boards of the Bermuda Institute of Ocean Sciences, the Exxon Corporation, and the Robert Wood Johnson Foundation.

Awards
 1963: Fellow of the Royal Society of Edinburgh.
 1973: Alexander Agassiz Medal of the National Academy of Sciences.
 1978: Fellow of the Royal Society.
 1978: Fellow of the American Academy of Arts and Sciences.

Life
Steele was born 15 November 1926, in Edinburgh. He was educated at George Watson's College, and graduated from University College London in 1946. In 1956 he married Evelyn and they had one son.

Steele died 4 November 2013, at his home in Falmouth, Massachusetts.

References

Woods Hole Oceanographic Institution
2013 deaths
Scottish oceanographers
1926 births
Alumni of University College London
People educated at George Watson's College
Scottish expatriates in the United States
Fellows of the Royal Society
Fellows of the Royal Society of Edinburgh
Fellows of the American Academy of Arts and Sciences
Scientists from Edinburgh